

Players

First-team squad

Transfers in

Transfers out

Staff

Coaching staff

 Michel Preud'homme (Head coach T1)
 Philippe Clement (Assistant coach T2)
 Stan Van den Buijs (Assistant coach T3)
 Stéphane Van der Heyden (Assistant coach T4)
 Jan Van Steenberghe (Goalkeeping coach)
 Joost Desender (Physical coach)
 Renaat Philippaerts (Physical coach)
 Siebe Hannoset (Performance coach)

Medical staff
 Karel Watteyne (Doctor)
 Thierry Dalewyn (Doctor)
 Jan Van Damme (Physiotherapist)
 Dimitri Dobbenie (Physiotherapist)
 Valentijn Deneulin (Physiotherapist)
 Peter Destickere (Masseur)

Team Support
 Dévy Rigaux (Team manager)
 Pascal Plovie (Kit man)
 Michel Dierings (Assistant kit man)
 Herman Brughmans (Assistant kit man)

Results

Belgian Pro League

League table

Belgian Cup

Final

The final took place on 22 March 2015 at the King Baudouin Stadium in Brussels.

UEFA Europa League

Group stage

Knockout phase

References

External links
Club website

Club Brugge KV seasons
Club Brugge KV